Events in the year 1883 in Norway.

Incumbents
Monarch: Oscar II

Events

Arts and literature
The novel Bondestudentar (English: Peasant students), written by Arne Garborg, is published.

Births

January to March
10 January – Kristian Arvesen, farmer and politician
21 January – Olav Aukrust, poet and teacher (died 1929)
27 January – Hans Ingvald Hansen Ratvik, politician (died 1966)
10 February – Gunnar Jahn, jurist, economist and politician (died 1971)
26 February – John Johansen, sprinter (died 1947)
21 February – Haldor Andreas Haldorsen, politician (died 1965)
16 March – Olaf Nordhagen, architect, engineer and artist (died 1925)
18 March – Sven Nielsen, politician (died 1958)

April to June
8 April – Olav Midttun, philologist, biographer and magazine editor (died 1972)
19 April – Jørgen Stubberud, polar explorer (died 1980)
27 April – Jakob Friis, politician (died 1956)
27 April – Ole Lilloe-Olsen, rifle shooter and Olympic gold medallist (died 1940)
29 April – Thorleif Holbye, sailor and Olympic gold medallist (died 1963)
6 May – Jens Hundseid, politician (died 1965)

July to September
11 July – Hans Svarstad, politician (died 1971)
22 July – Birger Gotaas, journalist (died 1960).
8 August – Kristoffer Olsen, sailor and Olympic gold medallist (died 1948)
8 September – Jens Salvesen, sailor and Olympic silver medallist (died 1976)
22 September – Ole Sørensen, sailor and Olympic gold medallist (died 1958)

October to December
5 October – Niels Nielsen, sailor and Olympic silver medallist (died 1961)
11 October – Kristian Welhaven, chief of the Oslo police force 1927–1954 (died 1975)
16 October – Halfdan Hansen, sailor and Olympic gold medallist (died 1953)
10 November – Olaf Bull, poet (died 1933)
11 November – Karl Johan Edvardsen, politician (died 1963)
14 November – Paal Kaasen, sailor and Olympic gold medallist (died 1963)
6 December – Arne Sunde, politician, Olympic shooter, army officer and diplomat (died 1972)
16 December – Haldor Bjerkeseth, politician (died 1974)

Full date unknown
Anton Ludvig Alvestad, politician and Minister (died 1956)
Edvard Drabløs, actor and theatre director (died 1976)
Alfred Evensen, musician (died 1942)
Olav Scheflo, politician and journalist (died 1943)
Jon Sundby, politician and Minister (died 1972)

Deaths
10 January – Elling Eielsen, minister and Lutheran Church leader in America (born 1804)
26 August – Halvor Heyerdahl Rasch, zoologist (born 1805)
14 November – Johannes Wilhelm Christian Dietrichson minister and Lutheran Church leader (born 1815)

Full date unknown
Peder Krabbe Gaarder, jurist and political theorist (born 1814)

See also

References